James Romanus Bilsborrow, O.S.B. (27 August 1862 – 19 June 1931) was an English Roman Catholic prelate and Benedictine priest. He served as the first Archbishop of Cardiff (1916–1920), having previously been Bishop of Port-Louis (1916–1920).

Born in Preston, Lancashire on 27 August 1862, he was ordained a priest in the Order of Saint Benedict on 23 June 1889. He was appointed the Bishop of the Diocese of Port-Louis in Mauritius on 13 September 1910. His consecration to the Episcopate took place on 24 February 1911, the principal consecrator was John Cuthbert Hedley, Bishop of Newport, and the principal co-consecrators were Peter Augustine O'Neill, Bishop Emeritus of Port-Louis and Joseph Robert Cowgill, Bishop of Leeds. Six years later, Bilsborrow was appointed the first Archbishop of Cardiff on 7 February 1916.

He resigned the post on 16 December 1920 and appointed Titular Archbishop of Cius. He died on 19 June 1931, aged 68.

References

1862 births
1931 deaths
20th-century Roman Catholic bishops in Mauritius
20th-century Roman Catholic archbishops in the United Kingdom
English Benedictines
Benedictine bishops
Clergy from Preston, Lancashire
Roman Catholic bishops of Port-Louis
Roman Catholic archbishops of Cardiff
Roman Catholic titular bishops